{{DISPLAYTITLE:C11H26NO2PS}}
The molecular formula C11H26NO2PS (molar mass: 267.37 g/mol, exact mass: 267.1422 u) may refer to:

 Chinese VX (CVX)
 VR (nerve agent)
 VX (nerve agent)